The Ahom dynasty (1228–1826) ruled the Ahom Kingdom in present-day Assam, India for nearly 598 years. The dynasty was established by Sukaphaa, a Shan prince of Mong Mao (present-day Yunnan, China) who came to Assam after crossing the Patkai mountains. The rule of this dynasty ended with the Burmese invasion of Assam and the subsequent annexation by the British East India Company following the Treaty of Yandabo in 1826.

In external medieval chronicles the kings of this dynasty were called Asam Raja, whereas the subjects of the kingdom called them Chaopha, or Swargadeo (in Assamese).

Chao-Pha 

The office of the Ahom king, was reserved exclusively for the descendants of the first king Sukaphaa (1228–1268) who came to Assam from Mong Mao in 1228. Succession was by agnatic primogeniture. Nevertheless, following Rudra Singha's deathbed injunction four of his five sons became the king one after the other.  The descendants of Sukaphaa were not eligible for ministerial positions—a division of power that was followed till the end of the dynasty and the kingdom.  When the nobles asked Atan Burhagohain to become the king, the Tai priests rejected the idea and he desisted from ascending the throne.

During three periods in the 14th century, the kingdom had no kings when acceptable candidates were not found. The ministers could remove unacceptable kings, and it used to involve executing the erstwhile king. In the 17th century a power struggle and the increasing number of claimants to the throne resulted in kings being deposed in quick succession, all of whom were executed after the new king was instated. To prevent this bloody end, a new rule was introduced during the reign of Sulikphaa Lora Roja—claimants to the throne had to be physically unblemished—which meant that threats to the throne could be removed by merely slitting the ear of an ambitious prince. Rudra Singha, suspecting his brother Lechai's intention, mutilated and banished him. The problem of succession remained, and on his deathbed, he instructed that all his sons were to become kings. One of his sons, Mohanmala Gohain, was superseded, who went on to lead a rebel group during the Moamoria rebellion. The later kings and officers exploited the unblemished rule, leading to weak kings being instated. Kamaleswar Singha (2-year-old son of Kadam Dighala) and Purandar Singha (10-year-old son of Brajanath and one of the last kings of this dynasty) came into office because their fathers were mutilated.

The Ahom kings were given divine origin. According to Ahom tradition, Sukaphaa was a descendant of Khunlung, the grandson of the king of the heavens Leungdon, who had come down from the heavens and ruled Mong-Ri-Mong-Ram.  During the reign of Suhungmung (1497–1539) which saw the composition of the first Assamese Buranji and increased Hindu influence, the Ahom kings were traced to the union of Indra (identified with Lengdon) and Syama (a low-caste woman), and were declared Indravamsa kshatriyas, a lineage created exclusively for the Ahoms. Suhungmung adopted the title Swarganarayan, and the later kings were called Swargadeo's (Lord of the heavens).  It was during his reign that the Buranji titled Sri Sri Swarganarayan Maharajor Jonmokotha was written wherein the source and lineage of the Ahom kings was connected to the Hindu God, Indra, Lord of the Heaven.

Coronation

The Swargadeo's coronation was called Singarigharutha, a ceremony that was performed first by Sudangphaa, (Bamuni Konwar) (1397–1407). The first coins in the new king's name were minted during the reign of Sutamla. Kamaleswar Singha (1795–1811) and Chandrakanta Singha's (1811–1818) coronations were not performed on the advice of Prime minister Purnananda Burhagohain, due to the financial constraints of State treasury caused by the internal disturbances during Moamoria rebellion. Kings who died in office were buried in vaults called Moidam, at Charaideo.  Some of the earlier Moidams were looted by Mir Jumla in the 17th century, and are lost.  Some later kings, especially with Rajeswar Singha (1751–1769), who were cremated had their ashes buried instead.

On ascent, the king would generally assume an Ahom name decided by the Ahom priests.  The name generally ended in Pha (Tai: Heaven), e.g. Susenghphaa.  Later kings also assumed a Hindu name that ended in Singha (Assamese: Lion): Susengphaa assumed the name Pratap Singha.  Buranjis occasionally would refer to a past king by a more informal and colorful name that focused on a specific aspect of the king.  Pratap Singha was also known as Burha Roja (Assamese: Old King) because when Pratap Singha became the king, he was quite advanced in age.

Royal offices

Subinphaa (1281–1293), the third Ahom king, delineated the Satghariya Ahom, the Ahom aristocracy of the Seven Houses.  Of this, the first lineage was that of the king.  The next two were the lineages of the Burhagohain and the Borgohain.  The last four were priestly lineages.  Sukhramphaa (1332–1364) established the position of Charing Raja which came to be reserved for the heir apparent.  The first Charing Raja was Sukhramphaa's half-brother, Chao Pulai, the son of the Kamata princess Rajani, but who did not ultimately become the Swargadeo. Suhungmung Dihingia Raja (1497–1539) settled the descendants of past kings in different regions that gave rise to seven royal houses—Saringiya, Tipamiya, Dihingiya, Samuguriya, Tungkhungiya, Parvatiya and Namrupiya—and periods of Ahom rule came to be known after these families.  The rule of the last such house, Tungkhungiya, was established by Gadadhar Singha (1681–1696) and his descendants ruled till the end of the Ahom kingdom.

Queens

Ahom queens (Kunworis) played important roles in the matter of state.  They were officially designated in a gradation of positions, called the Bor Kuwori (Chief Queen), Parvatia Kuwori, Raidangia Kuwori, Tamuli Kuwori, etc. who were generally daughters of Ahom noblemen and high officials.  Lesser wives of the Swargadeo were called Chamua Kunworis. Some of the queens were given separate estates that were looked after by state officials (Phukans or Baruas). During the reign of Siba Singha (1714–1744), the king gave his royal umbrella and royal insignia to his queens—Phuleshwari Kunwori, Ambika Kunwori and Anadari Kunwori in succession— to rule the kingdom.  They were called Bor-Rojaa. Some queens maintained office even after the death or removal of the kings, as happened with Pakhori Gabhoru and Kuranganayani who were queens to multiple kings.

One way in which the importance of the queens can be seen is that many of them are named on coins; typically the king's name would be on the obverse of the coin and the queen's on the reverse.

Court influences
Sukaphaa's ruling deity was Chum-Pha and Sheng-mung a pair of non-Hindu, non-Buddhist gods, and he was accompanied by classes of priests called Deodhai, Bailung etc.  But the Ahom kings let themselves be influenced by the religion and customs of those they ruled over.  Sudangphaa Bamuni Konwar (1397–1407) installed a Brahmin of Habung, in whose household he was born and raised, as his adviser, but he himself did not convert to Hinduism. Susenphaa (1439–1488) constructed a temple at Negheriting. Suhungmung Dihingia Rojaa (1497–1539) was the first Ahom king to expand the kingdom and the polity, allow Assamese influence in his court and accept a non-Ahom title—Swarganarayan. Sukhaamphaa Khora Rojaa (1552–1603) began consulting Hindu astrologers alongside the traditional Deodhai-Bailung priests, and Pratap Singha (1603–1641) installed 13 Brahmin families as diplomats. Assamese language coexisted with Tai language in the court till the reign of Pratap Singha, during whose rule Assamese became dominant.  Sutamla (1648–1663) was the first Ahom king to be initiated into the Mahapuruxiya Dharma, and Ahom kings till Sulikphaa lora roja (1679–1681) continued to be disciples of one sattra or the other. Mahapuruxiya pontiffs belonging to different sects began playing a greater role in state politics.  After the chaos of the late 17th century, Gadadhar Sinha (1681–1696), the first Tungkhungiya king began his rule with a deep distrust of these religious groups.  His son and successor Rudra Singha (1696–1714) searched for an alternative state religion, and his son and successor Siba Sinha (1714–1744) formally adopted Saktism, the nemesis of the Mahapuruxiya sects.  The persecution of the Mahapuruxiya Sattras under the Tunkhungiya rulers following Siba Singha was a crucial factor leading to the Moamoria rebellion that greatly depleted the Ahom kingdom.

King's Guards
The king was guarded by a six thousand strong household troop under a Bhitarual Phukan.  A unit of musketeers consisting of the king's relatives was established by Sukhamphaa Khora Raja that protected the capital (under the Bajua Hilaidari Konwar) and the palace and environs (Bhitarual Hilaidari Konwar).

Timeline

Swargadeo dynastic lineage
In the nearly 600-years 39-Swargadeo dynastic history, there are three progenitor kings (all subsequent kings are descendants of these kings).  They are Sukaphaa, who established the kingdom; Suhungmung, who made the greatest territorial and political expansion of the kingdom; and Supaatphaa, who established the House of Tungkhugia kings that reigned the kingdom during its political and cultural zenith, as well as the period of decay and end (except for Jogeswar Singha, who was a descendant of Supaatphaa's father Gobar, and who was installed as a puppet king by the Burmese).

The dynastic history and dates that are accepted today are the result of a re-examination of Ahom and other documents by a team of Nora astronomers and experts who were commissioned to do so by Gaurinath Singha (1780–1795).

Notes

References

External links
 A mighty clan's website An article by Saikh Md Sabah Al-Ahmed in The Assam Tribune "Horizon", Saturday special, dated 19 September 2009
 Coins of Ahom Dynasty

Tai history
Assam
Former monarchies of Asia
States and territories established in 1228
Dynasties of India
Ahom kingdom
1820s disestablishments
Articles which contain graphical timelines